David Schiel is a marine ecologist and biologist from New Zealand. He studied at the University of Auckland and was awarded a PhD in 1980The title of his doctoral thesis was A demographic and experimental evaluation of plant and herbivore interactions in subtidal algal stands. He is currently a Distinguished Professor of University of Canterbury.

References

Academic staff of the University of Canterbury
New Zealand biologists
New Zealand ecologists
University of Notre Dame alumni
University of Auckland alumni
Living people
Year of birth missing (living people)